Chengmari Gewog is a former gewog (village block) of Samtse District, Bhutan. Chengmari Gewog, together with Chargharey Gewog, comprises part of Chengmari Dungkhag.

References 

Former gewogs of Bhutan
Samtse District